The following is a list of James Madison Dukes men's basketball head coaches. There have been 11 head coaches of the Dukes in their 54-season history.

James Madison's current head coach is Mark Byington. He was hired as the Dukes' head coach in March 2020, replacing Louis Rowe, who was fired after the 2019–20 season.

References

James Madison

James Madison Dukes basketball, men's, coaches